Two naval vessels of Japan have been named Yashima:

 Japanese battleship Yashima, she was commissioned in 1897 of Fuji-class battleship of Imperial Japanese Navy and sank by a mine in 1904.
 Japanese patrol boat Yashima, she was commissioned in 1988 of Mizuho-class patrol vessel of Japan Coast Guard.

Japanese Navy ship names